Jeremiah Hayes is a Canadian film director, writer and editor. He is most noted as co-director, co-writer and the editor of the film Reel Injun, for which he won the Gemini Award for Best Direction in a Documentary Program at the 25th Gemini Awards in 2010. Hayes is also recognized for his work editing Rumble: The Indians Who Rocked the World, for which he won the Canadian Screen Award for Best Editing in a Documentary at the 6th Canadian Screen Awards in 2018. Reel Injun won a Peabody Award for Best Electronic Media in 2011 and Rumble won the Special Jury Award for Masterful Storytelling at the Sundance Film Festival in 2017. In 2020, Rumble received an Emmy Award nomination for Outstanding Arts & Culture Documentary. In 2021, Reel Injun is featured in the Academy Museum of Motion Pictures core exhibition of the Stories of Cinema.

As a director, his other credits include Elefanti (1989), Silence & Storm (1995), God Comes As a Child (1998), and The Prom (1998).

His other credits as an editor include Tia & Piujuq (2018), Above the Drowning Sea (2017), Sol (2014), The Wolverine: The Fight of the James Bay Cree (2014), Shekinah: The Intimate Life of Hasidic Women (2013), The Last Explorer (2009), Inside the Great Magazines (2007), Vendetta Song (2005), and Unbreakable Minds (2004).

In 2021 Jeremiah directed Dear Audrey. Dear Audrey is about the life of Canadian filmmaker Martin Duckworth, and his wife Audrey Schirmer's struggle with Alzheimer's. It is produced by SwingDog Films, Cineflix Media Inc, The National Film Board of Canada, and The Super Channel.

Honors & Awards 
- In 2010, Hayes was awarded a Gemini Award for Best Direction in a Documentary Program for his work co-directing of Reel Injun.

- In 2018, he won the Canadian Screen Award for Best Editing in a Documentary for his work editing Rumble.

- Reel Injun won a Peabody Award for Best Electronic Media in 2011

- Rumble won the Special Jury Award for Masterful Storytelling at the Sundance Film Festival in 2017. 

- Rumble was also nomination for an Emmy Award for Outstanding Arts & Culture Documentary in 2020.

- In 2021, Reel Injun is featured in the Academy Museum of Motion Pictures core exhibition of the Stories of Cinema.

Personal life 
Born in Walnut Creek, California on April 18, 1966.

Graduated with a Bachelor of Fine Arts (BFA) in Film Production at Concordia University Montreal in 1990.

Son of Jeremiah F. Hayes who is recognized in the field of Electrical Engineering.

Filmography

References

External links

Jeremiah Hayes at The National Film Board of Canada
Jeremiah Hayes at Cinema Politica

Date of birth missing (living people)
Living people
Canadian documentary film directors
Canadian film editors
Best Editing in a Documentary Canadian Screen Award winners
Year of birth missing (living people)